peacenotwar is a piece of malware/Protestware  created by Brandon Nozaki Miller. In March 2022, it was added as a dependency in an update for node-ipc, a common JavaScript dependency.

Background

Between 7 March and 8 March 2022, Brandon Nozaki Miller, the maintainer of the node-ipc package on the npm package registry, released two updates containing malicious code targeting systems in Russia and Belarus. A week later, Miller added the peacenotwar module as a dependency to node-ipc. The function of peacenotwar was to create a text file titled WITH-LOVE-FROM-AMERICA.txt on the desktop of affected machines, containing a message in protest of the Russo-Ukrainian War; it also imports a dependency on a package (nmp colors package) that would result in a Denial of Service (DoS) to any server using it.

Impact
Because node-ipc was a common software dependency, it compromised several other projects which relied upon it.

Among the affected projects was Vue.js, which required node-ipc as a dependency but didn't specify a version. Some users of Vue.js were affected if the dependency was fetched from specific packages. Unity Hub 3.1 was also affected, but a patch was issued on the same day as the release.

See also 

 Malware
 Hacktivism
 Reactions to the 2022 Russian invasion of Ukraine

References

Internet-based activism
2022 in computing
Reactions to the 2022 Russian invasion of Ukraine
Malware